Maxwell Cheeseman (born 18 June 1962) is a Trinidad and Tobago former cyclist. He competed at the 1988 Summer Olympics and the 1992 Summer Olympics.

References

External links
 

1962 births
Living people
Trinidad and Tobago male cyclists
Olympic cyclists of Trinidad and Tobago
Cyclists at the 1988 Summer Olympics
Cyclists at the 1992 Summer Olympics
People from San Fernando, Trinidad and Tobago
20th-century Trinidad and Tobago people